House of Whales, formerly Treehouse, is a live hip hop band originating from Chicago, Illinois and currently residing in Oakland, California. The band's current line-up consists of Rico Sisney (MC, keys), Aunnoy Badruzzaman (Drummer, Production), Danny Varela (DJ, Producer), and Luis Mayorga (Guitar, Bass). The group is known for their unique approach to the genre of hip hop, utilizing live instrumentation and electronically produced sounds.

History

Origin (2010–2015)
Badruzzaman formed the group in 2010 after collaborating with Sisney. The two began shooting around the idea of starting a new project and began looking for bass players to round out the group’s sound, “We had jammed with a few other people, but we stopped jamming with people as soon as we jammed with Mike Ruby. It was just instant,” Badruzzaman said. Though founded in Chicago, the band’s members originate from across the U.S. Badruzzaman and Ruby are from Southern and Northern California and Sisney is from Atlanta. In 2012, the band released their debut EP, Tell No One, following their appearance in New York City at CMJ Music Marathon 2012  and a month-long tour in the San Francisco Bay Area. The EP went on to be nominated for a 2012 Independent Music Award. In 2014, the band released their self-titled LP and went on the receive their second Independent Music Award Nomination.

Colors (2018–present)
House of Whales released their first single with a new line-up on June 21, 2018. As a tribute to summer time in Chicago, "Colors" incorporated some of the city’s hardest working artists and musicians. Featuring MC Show You Suck and Horn Bread (Sidewalk Chalk’s Horn Section, DBP and Sam Trump) with artwork by Jake Castro.

Discography

Albums
 House of Whales (2014)

EPs
 Tell No One EP (2012)

Singles
 "Pocket Life" (2011)
 "Ana" (2011)
 "Growing Conscious" (2011)
 "Colors" (2018)

Remix
 Childish Gambino - This Is America (song) (Unofficial Remix)

References

External links
House of Whales Website
House of Whales on Facebook
House of Whales on Spotify
House of Whales on SoundCloud
House of Whales on Twitter

American hip hop groups
Musical groups from Chicago